Cashier is a former two-masted Delaware Bay oyster schooner located at the Bayshore Center in the Bivalve section of Commercial Township in Cumberland County, New Jersey. She was added to the National Register of Historic Places on February 8, 2016, for her significance in agriculture and maritime history. According to the nomination form, she is the "oldest, continuously-worked American-flagged merchant vessel in the United States".

History and description
Built in Cedarville by Milton Duffield, she was launched in 1849 and worked the waters around Bivalve until 2000. An engine, shaft, and propeller were added in 1916. One mast was removed in 1938. She is currently sunk in a boat slip in a marsh of the Maurice River at the Bayshore Center. An exhibit, "Cashier's Pilothouse", is featured at the museum.

See also
 National Register of Historic Places listings in Cumberland County, New Jersey

References

External links
 

Commercial Township, New Jersey
National Register of Historic Places in Cumberland County, New Jersey
New Jersey Register of Historic Places
Oyster schooners
Ships built in New Jersey
Ships on the National Register of Historic Places in New Jersey